This is a list of diplomatic missions of Lebanon, excluding honorary consulates.

Africa

 Algiers (Embassy)

 Kinshasa (Embassy)

 Cairo (Embassy)
 Alexandria (Consulate-General)

 Libreville (Embassy)

 Accra (Embassy)

 Conakry (Embassy)

 Abidjan (Embassy)

 Monrovia (Embassy)

 Tripoli (Embassy)

 Rabat (Embassy)

 Abuja (Embassy)
 Lagos (Consulate-General)

 Dakar (Embassy)

 Freetown (Embassy)

 Pretoria (Embassy)

 Khartoum (Embassy)

 Tunis (Embassy)

Americas

 Buenos Aires (Embassy)

 Brasília (Embassy)
 Rio de Janeiro (Consulate-General)
 São Paulo (Consulate-General)

 Ottawa (Embassy)
 Montreal (Consulate-General)

 Santiago (Embassy)

 Bogotá (Embassy)

 Havana (Embassy)

 Quito (Embassy)

 Mexico City (Embassy)

 Asunción (Embassy)

 Washington, D.C. (Embassy)
 Detroit (Consulate-General)
 Los Angeles (Consulate-General)
 New York City (Consulate-General)

 Montevideo (Embassy)

 Caracas (Embassy)

Asia

 Yerevan (Embassy)

 Manama (Embassy)

 Beijing (Embassy)

 New Delhi (Embassy)

 Jakarta (Embassy)

 Tehran (Embassy)

 Baghdad (Embassy)
 Najaf (Consulate-General)

 Tokyo (Embassy)

 Amman (Embassy)

 Astana (Embassy)

 Kuwait City (Embassy)

 Kuala Lumpur (Embassy)

 Muscat (Embassy)

 Islamabad (Embassy)

 Doha (Embassy)

 Riyadh (Embassy)
 Jeddah (Consulate-General)

 Seoul (Embassy)

 Damascus (Embassy)

 Ankara (Embassy)
 Istanbul (Consulate-General)

 Abu Dhabi (Embassy)
 Dubai (Consulate-General)

 Sana'a (Embassy)

Europe

 Vienna (Embassy)

 Brussels (Embassy)

 Sofia (Embassy)

 Nicosia (Embassy)

 Prague (Embassy)

 Paris (Embassy)
 Marseille (Consulate-General)

 Berlin (Embassy)

 Athens (Embassy)

 Rome (Embassy)

 Budapest (Embassy)

 Rome (Embassy)
 Milan (Consulate-General)

 The Hague (Embassy)

 Warsaw (Embassy)

 Bucharest (Embassy)

 Moscow (Embassy)

 Belgrade (Embassy)

 Madrid (Embassy)

 Stockholm (Embassy)

 Bern (Embassy)

 Kyiv (Embassy)

 London (Embassy)

Oceania

 Canberra (Embassy)
 Melbourne (Consulate-General)
 Sydney (Consulate-General)

Multilateral Organizations
 Brussels (Mission to the European Union)
 Cairo (Permanent Mission to the Arab League)
 Geneva (Permanent Mission to the United Nations and other international organizations)
 New York City (Permanent Mission to the United Nations)
 Paris (Permanent Mission to UNESCO)
 Vienna (Permanent Mission to the United Nations and other international organizations)

Gallery

See also

Foreign relations of Lebanon
List of diplomatic missions in Lebanon

Notes

References
Ministry of Foreign Affairs of Lebanon
Embassy of Lebanon in Ottawa, Canada
Embassy of Lebanon in London, United Kingdom
Embassy of Lebanon in Washington DC, USA

 
Diplomatic missions
Lebanon